Moshe Bar may refer to:

Moshe Bar (investor) (born 1971), Israeli/American technologist and author, and founder of Qumranet
Moshe Bar (neuroscientist), scientist at Harvard Medical School